The North–South Prize is awarded annually by the North-South Centre of the Council of Europe to two public figures who are recognised for their deep commitment, outstanding achievements and hope they have generated in the field of protection of human rights, the defence of pluralist democracy and North-South partnership and solidarity. The prize originated in 1995 and it is sometimes known as the Lisbon North–South Prize.

Call for candidates and selection
The "quadrilogue" (made up of governments, members of parliament, local and regional authorities, and non-governmental organisations from civil society) involved in overseeing the North-South Centre of the Council of Europe, along with media representatives and international and regional government organisations, are urged to name individuals or an organisation whose activities are considered worthy of distinction.
The call for candidates is made on its website and its Newsletters. The Centre's partners are similarly asked to inform their respective media organs. The file is sent for review to each member of the jury. After studying the files, the North–South Prize Jury makes a final decision on the candidates.

Candidate selection criteria
The Prize is awarded to a candidate from the North (Central and Northern Europe) and one from the South (Southern Mediterranean countries and Africa), preferably to a man and a woman. Candidates should be recognised within the following fields of action: human rights protection, defence of pluralist democracy, promotion of public awareness about issues concerning global solidarity and interdependence, and reinforcement of the North-South partnership. Candidates may be nominated for their achievements within the cultural, institutional and political fields.

North-South Prize Jury
The North–South Prize Jury is composed of the Members of the Bureau of the North-South Centre and the Secretary General of the Council of Europe, under the presidency of the Chairman of the Executive Council of the North-South Centre. The Jury is helped in its task by the Secretariat of the North-South Centre.

The winners

External links
 North-South Centre of the Council of Europe
 Publications of the North-South Prize Award Ceremony

References

Human rights awards
Council of Europe
European awards
Awards established in 1995
1995 establishments in Europe